The 2017 CBSA Haining International Snooker Open was a non-ranking snooker tournament that took place from 23 to 27 October 2017 in Haining, China.

Matthew Selt was the defending champion, but he lost 2–4 against Yu Delu in the quarter-finals.

Mark Selby defeated Tom Ford 5–1 in the final and made a maximum break in the third frame. Selby's maximum does not count on the official maximum break list as this was a CBSA organised tournament.

Prize fund 
The breakdown of prize money of the event is shown below:

Main draw

Top half

Section 1

Section 2

Section 3

Section 4

Bottom half

Section 5

Section 6

Section 7

Section 8

Finals

Final

References 

Haining Open
Haining Open
Haining Open
Haining Open